Astley Paston Cooper Ashhurst (21 August 1876 – 19 September 1932) was an American surgeon and medical historian. In 1905, as a young surgeon, he observed Peter Freyer perform a suprapubic prostatectomy in London. He later co-authored the Textbook on Surgery with John B. Deaver.

References 

American urologists
1876 births
1932 deaths
American writers